Chengzhong Xu from the Wayne State University, Detroit, MI was named Fellow of the Institute of Electrical and Electronics Engineers (IEEE) in 2016 for leadership in resource management for parallel and distributed systems.

References 

Fellow Members of the IEEE
Wayne State University faculty
Living people
Nanjing University alumni
Alumni of the University of Hong Kong
Year of birth missing (living people)